The Resistance is the 47th book in the Animorphs series, written by K.A. Applegate.  It is known to have been ghostwritten by Ellen Geroux. It is the third book in the ten-book arc that finalized the story of the Animorphs.  It is primarily narrated by Jake, with flashbacks secondarily narrated by Isaiah Fitzhenry, a great-uncle of Jake's grandfather who was an American Civil War lieutenant.

Plot summary
A free Hork-Bajir is captured by the Yeerks and involuntarily reveals the location of the Hork-Bajir valley. Jake and the other Animorphs head to the colony to warn the Hork-Bajir. Jake thinks it would be best to abandon the valley and flee, but the Hork-Bajir, led by Toby Hamee, insist that they want to stay and fight. As a part of the battle strategy, the Animorphs morph beavers to make a dam to flush the Yeerks out of the valley. Jake and Tobias spot a group of campers who would likely be innocent victims of the fighting and approach them to try to convince them to leave. They don't buy Jake's story and Jake decides that he must show them the truth and he and Tobias both morph in front of them. It turns out that the campers are Star Trek fans and insist on helping the Animorphs. They assist Marco's parents (who now live in the valley) and the free Hork-Bajir in an assembly line of creating spears and other weapons.

Meanwhile, every other chapter consists of somewhat-related diary entries from Lt. Isaiah Fitzhenry, a great-uncle to Jake's grandfather, who fought in the American Civil War, specifically against General Forrest.

The battle for the valley begins, and it is very bloody with many dead. Visser One morphs a monstrous eight headed alien creature, and the formidable Yeerk force can only be driven back when the water from the dam is released down the valley. One of the campers was killed in the battle. Jake reminds Toby that the victory is only temporary and that the Yeerks will be back. Toby realizes that they must leave the valley, and Jake says that maybe one day they can return. Jake returns home and reads the conclusion of Fitzhenry's diary. He received a fatal wound in the battle, but expresses in his last written thought that he hopes he did his best. Jake is uncertain of how his story will end, but as he closes the book he whispers "Yeah, me, too."

Morphs

Animorphs books
Novels set during the American Civil War
2000 American novels
2000 science fiction novels
Epistolary novels
Novels with multiple narrators